Beyblade: Metal Fusion, known in Japan as , is a Japanese manga created by Takafumi Adachi, serialized in Shogakukan's monthly magazine CoroCoro Comic between September 2008 and February 2012. The series is a spin-off of the original Beyblade manga series written by Takao Aoki.

The manga inspired an anime production, retroactively named Beyblade: Metal Saga, which encompasses four seasons: Metal Fusion, Metal Masters, Metal Fury and Shogun Steel. The first season’s  animation was produced by Tatsunoko Pro, with subsequent seasons and spin-offs being produced by SynergySP. It premiered on TV Tokyo on April 5, 2009, and aired until December 23, 2012. Nelvana, which licensed and produced English adaptations of the original anime series, also localized the four seasons of Metal Saga. In India, it is started from 11 October 2010 on Cartoon Network India.

Plot and characters

The series follows the adventures of Gingka Hagane, a Beyblader who is searching for his hidden past while trying to defeat the evil Dark Nebula organization, and Ryuga, a man with the Forbidden Bey known as Lightning L-Drago.

Metal Fusion
The plot varies between manga and anime with several differences. One notable difference is that in the manga, the Beys transform for their upgrades, while in the anime, the characters just switch parts or get an entirely new Bey. Another difference is that, in the manga, the characters started with the Metal System (4-piece top), while in the anime they started with the Hybrid Wheel System (5-piece top).

The series stars Gingka Hagane, a talented blader traveling all around Japan to get stronger so he can defeat the Dark Nebula, an evil organization that is also responsible for the supposed death of Gingka's father, Ryo Hagane. Gingka aims to recover the forbidden bey, Lightning L-Drago, which has been stolen by the Dark Nebula to use its powers to fulfill their wicked ambitions. Along with his bey, Storm Pegasus, Gingka must face and defeat many foes. Gingka's second-biggest rival is Kyoya Tategami, formerly head of a bad blader group, called the Face Hunters. Kyoya's goal is to defeat Gingka. Gingka is the blader who believes that every blader has a blader's spirit in them. The Dark Nebula recruits a blader named Ryuga, who is given L-Drago. He travels around the world, defeating and either recruiting or destroying the Beyblades of other bladers. Gingka battles Ryuga but is defeated. His friends are also defeated, including Kyoya. There is a tournament that the Dark Nebula has secretly organized called Battle Bladers, and Gingka hopes to battle Ryuga in the final match. Phoenix, a masked, mysterious blader that appears at the best times, often saving Gingka, his friends, and his rivals. In a fierce battle with Doji, the head of the Dark Nebula, Phoenix saves Hyoma and Kenta. After Gingka arrives, the ceiling begins to collapse, and a broken piece breaks Phoenix's mask, revealing that Phoenix is Ryo, Gingka's father. Ryo explains how Storm Pegasus and the Lightning L-Drago came into existence. After this event, it is Kyoya vs Ryuga, in which Kyoya starts off great but once the spirits of L-Drago enter and consume Ryuga's body he cannot hold his ground. Ryuga then explains that it is Gingka's fault that every one of his friends has been absorbed by the vicious L-Drago. It is the final battle and Ryuga seems to be using his full power against Gingka. Realizing that his friends will always be with him, he retaliates and calls for Pegasus. Before he can do that, it seems that L-Drago is trying to absorb Ryuga himself, changing him into a dragon/monster-like form. Gingka's friends are extremely worried and confused until Ryo comes and explains that nobody had been able to control L-Drago more than Ryuga. Furthermore, Ryo explains that the Lightning L-Drago is responsible for Ryuga's misbehavior. After that Gingka realizes that he needs to save Ryuga and free him of the dark power held in Lightning L-Drago. He uses a new special move, Galaxy Nova, and defeats L-Drago. Ryuga walks away disappointed, but not because he lost, but because he could not control Lightning L-Drago. Gingka tries to pick up Pegasus but Pegasus disappears because it went past its limits numerous times. Ryo reassures Gingka that Pegasus will come back, the crew then celebrates with Hikaru, Tsubasa, and Kyoya, who have just been released from the hospital.

Metal Masters
After Storm Pegasus sacrifices itself to defeat Ryuga (Carman Melville) and Lightning L-Drago, Gingka (Robert Tinkler) hears from a rock which contains Galaxy Pegasus W105RF, The legendary bey! First Galaxy Pegasus battles with a new bey named Ray Striker and its owner, Masamune Kadoya (Cameron Ansell). Together with Madoka (Barbara Mamabolo), Masamune, Yu (Denise Oliver), Tsubasa (David Reale), and Gingka, they form a team called Gan Gan Galaxy to participate  a new Beyblade World Tournament. On the way, they have to battle Team Garcias, Team Wang Hu Zhong, Team Lovushka, Team Excalibur, Team Desert Blaze, Team Chandora, Team Wild Fang, and Team Starbreaker with a new guy, Toby/Faust (Benjamin Israel) and other members of Team Starbreaker. The matches are hard at first, and they become harder as they progress through the world tournament. Unknowingly, a man named Dr. Ziggurat attempts to find power and differentiate Beys by using the tournament to collect data for experiments he calls the Arrangements. These devices enhance a Blader's skills in Beyblade. But Gingka realizes that it was not safe. Therefore,  Gingka & his friends together try to stop Dr. Ziggurat (Richard Waugh) & his Spiral Force. Gingka and Masamune battled together with a bey named Twisted Tempo. Ryuga helped Gingka and Masamune. Then they were successful to stop the spiral force.

Metal Fury
After their latest triumph against Hades Inc., Gingka is challenged by Kyoya to have a battle on a mysterious island. Gingka and Kyoya both fight as hard as they can, but neither can seem to gain the upper hand until Pegasus is stuck in mud. Kyoya uses his special move, King Lion Reverse Windstrike, but Gingka and Pegasus rally and fight on. Suddenly, both Gingka's and Kyoya's Beyblades transform. Gingka's new Beyblade is called Cosmic Pegasus, and Kyoya's Fang Leone. They soon realize that both Gingka and Kyoya's Beyblade were given power by a mysterious light that fell from the sky. Gingka and his friends find themselves saving a boy named Yuki from a mysterious boy named Johannes. As well as a boy genius and astronomer, Yuki is also a Blader who owns Mercury Anubius. Yuki came to tell Gingka and his friends about the Star Fragment which split into 10 pieces, and that two of them are in Gingka's and Kyoya's Beyblades, and that it must not fall into the hands of evil. He witnessed the Star Fragment fall from the sky and release beams of light. That evening, the Star Fragment told him that a great evil is trying to revive the God of Destruction, Nemesis by using the power of the Star Fragment and use it to destroy the world. In order to prevent Nemesis from being revived, they must find the rest of the ten "Legendary Bladers" who also have Beyblades with the power of the Star Fragment. Gingka and Kyoya travel first to an island in the Pacific after receiving intel that one of the Star Fragment pieces fell there. When they reach, they discover Ryuga at the top of a dormant volcano with a new Beyblade, L-Drago Destructor. Kyoya battles Ryuga, but the overwhelming attack power of Ryuga's Beyblade defeats Kyoya. Gingka arrives to see Kyoya defeated, and explains to him that they need Ryuga's strength in order to take down Nemesis. However, Ryuga is stubborn and says that he will only cooperate if Gingka beats him in a battle. Ryuga and Gingka battle, and after a long fight, Gingka loses because was not powerful to fight Ryuga himself he was very weak. Ryuga leaves saying he would try and take the rest of the Star Fragments for himself. Gingka and his friends travel to China where it is believed a mysterious Crimson Flash Beyblade might be one of the Legendary Bladers. They all enter a Tag Team Tournament, where Gingka masters a new special move, Cosmic Tornado against Dashan Wang, and Kyoya gets a new special move, King Lion Crushing Fang. Kyoya and Benkei battle Aguma and Bao, only to find out that Bao, who has the Crimson Flash Beyblade, is actually not the Legendary Blader and instead of that it is Aguma, with his Scythe Kronos. Gingka and Yuki advance to the final the face Bao and Aguma, however at the last moment Gingka is stopped from using his special move and Johannes recruits Aguma. After that, they head to America and witnessed the Destoryer Dome! After Block A and B each have three bladers left, the final six battle for the last time with the winner being King along with his bey, Variares D:D who turns out to be the sixth legendary blader. In Africa, Team Wild Fang help them through a maze and a mountain entering a sacred place where they meet Dynamis and his bey, Jade Jupiter who is the seventh legendary blader. He tells them about the history of the star fragment and that one of the pieces has already fell into Nemesis and that there are two more legendary bladers left. Kyoya leaves the group and heads off to unknown parts. They head off to Easter Island and battle trying to see who the legendary blader of Winter is. A new blader named Chris and Masamune battle in the finals and after its over, Chris is revealed to be the legendary blader with his bey, Phantom Orion.

Media

Manga

The Metal Fusion manga was written and illustrated by Takafumi Adachi. In Japan, they were published in the monthly CoroCoro Comic magazine, from September 2008 to February 2012. Shogakukan later compiled the chapters into eleven shinsōban volumes. The first volume was released on March 27, 2009, and the last on March 28, 2012. The chapters were released without a title during the serialisation, where they were identified only by an arc name and a chapter number. The chapter names appeared for the first time in the volume compilation.

Adachi returned to draw a one-shot reunion that was published in the Summer 2019 issue of CoroCoro Aniki.

Anime

The first season was produced by Tatsunoko Pro. Nelvana produced the English-language version and licensed the series as Beyblade: Metal Fusion. The series aired in Japan on TV Tokyo between April 5, 2009, and March 28, 2010. It premiered in North America later that Fall on YTV in Canada and Cartoon Network in the United States. Beyblade: Metal Fusion briefly rerun on Primo TV in late 2020. The Metal Trilogy and Shogun Steel are rerunning on Disney XD as of January 3, 2021.

In 2010, Nelvana announced that they were looking at parties interested in producing a second season of the anime series, which would be titled Beyblade: Metal Masters. The second season produced by SynergySP instead of Tatsunoko Pro, aired in Japan from April 4, 2010, and March 27, 2011. A third season was announced in Shogakukan's CoroCoro Comic magazine. Released as  Beyblade: Metal Fury in North America, the third season aired between April 3, 2011 and April 1, 2012. The fourth and final season, Beyblade: Shogun Steel, aired in Japan between April 8, 2012, and December 23, 2012. Episodes 39–45 of this season were released on DVD on August 27, 2013, and September 25, 2013.

Video games

The first video game to be released from the Beyblade: Metal Fusion series was Metal Fight Beyblade DS, which debuted on March 26, 2009 for the Nintendo DS in Japan and November 9, 2010 in the United States. The majority of the games produced so far have only been released in Japan, though Hudson Soft has localized the second Nintendo DS game and the Nintendo Wii game for North America, which is called "Battle Fortress". So far, all dedicated Metal Fight Beyblade games have been developed and published by Hudson Soft. The most recent Metal Fight Beyblade video game to be released was "Metal Fight Beyblade: Choujou Kessen! Big Bang Blader" for the DS in Japan, which was released on December 2, 2010.

Metal Saga toyline

4D Ultimate System
The 4D System continues on from the HWS System, adding on some gimmicks to the parts:
Face Bolt: These hold the Beyblade parts together (except the Performance Tip).
Energy Ring: The Energy Ring is where the launcher hooks stay when connected and determines the direction the bey will spin. In three cases in this System, the Energy Ring is not used (Variares D:D, L-Drago Destructor F:S and L-Drago Guardian GB145MB).
4D Metal Wheel: Similar to the Fusion Wheel, a 4D Wheel is the part that helps attack other Beyblades. The main difference between the two types is that the 4D Wheel is composed of three or two parts, rather than one: Metal Frame, PC Frame and the Core. By using these three components in different positions, the Bey's contact points can change.
Spin Track: The Spin Track helps the beyblade spin, helps hold the beyblade together and connects the Performance Tip to the rest of the other parts.
Performance Tip: The Performance tip is a part of the bey that makes it move and spin.

Zero-G System
The Zero-G Season introduced a reformed system:
Stone Face: These hold the Beyblade parts together (except the Performance Tip). Smaller and Thinner than the HWS Face Bolt.
Chrome Wheel: The Zero-G equivalent of the HWS Fusion Wheel. Generally weighing around 30-35 grams and is half as thick as a typical HWS Fusion Wheel. Two Chromium Wheels can be clipped together (one replacing the Crystal Wheel), increasing the weight of the Bey.
Crystal Wheel: The Zero-G equivalent of the HWS Energy Ring. Decides what Element a Bey will be and changes the contact points of the Chromium Wheel.
Spin Track: The Spin Track helps a Beyblade spin and helps its weight and speed. It also connects the Performance Tip to the rest of the Beyblade, helping construct the beyblade.
Performance Tip: The Performance Tip is the main thing that makes the Beyblade spin, chooses its movement pattern and determines a good amount of its Attack, Defense, and Stamina. Unlike in the previous systems, the performance tips perform differently in a special stadium called a Zero-G Stadium, which sways depending on the movement of the beyblades. Stamina type tips become defense type tips and vice versa, and attack type tips become better suited to the Zero-G Stadium made specifically for Zero-G Beyblades.

All of these toys are made by Takara Tomy in Japan  Hasbro in the USA, Australia and Canada , Europe , India  and by Sonokong in South Korea.

The Metal toyline was marketed and distributed by Takara Tomy in Japan; Hasbro in North America, Australia, Europe, and India; and by Sonokong in South Korea.

See also
 Beyblade
 Beyblade: Shogun Steel

References

External links

Official D-rights Metal Fight Beyblade website
Official TV Tokyo Metal Fight Beyblade website 
Official Nelvana Beyblade: Metal Fusion website

Beyblade
2009 anime television series debuts
2010 anime television series debuts
2011 anime television series debuts
Animated television series about children
Japanese children's animated action television series
Japanese children's animated science fantasy television series
Japanese children's animated sports television series
Shogakukan franchises
Shōnen manga
Takara Tomy franchises
Tatsunoko Production
TV Tokyo original programming
Works based on Takara Tomy toys